Krystian Aranowski (born 11 April 1988) is a Polish rower. He competed in the Men's eight event at the 2012 and 2016 Summer Olympics.

References

1988 births
Living people
Polish male rowers
Olympic rowers of Poland
Rowers at the 2012 Summer Olympics
Rowers at the 2016 Summer Olympics
Sportspeople from Toruń
World Rowing Championships medalists for Poland
European Rowing Championships medalists
21st-century Polish people